A constitutional referendum, the nation's first, was held in Belize on 7 February 2008, coinciding with the 2008 general elections.

The question asked was: "Should the Senate of Belize be elected?"

While approved by 61% of voters with a 46% turnout, the referendum was only consultative, and the government chose not to implement the result, considering the low turnout.

Background 

Ever since independence from Great Britain in 1981, Belize has had its upper house appointed. Currently, there are 12 senators and a President.

An elected Senate, according to its proponents, would return the decision over control of the nation's resources and development to the Belizean people.

Discussion 
Earlier in the year, Prime Minister Said Musa had given tacit support to the idea of an elected Senate, and eventually brought up the matter in session of the House of Representatives on December 19, 2007.

Musa introduced a bill to allow for a referendum, to be held in 2008 likely alongside the general elections, to determine Belizeans' thoughts on the issue. The Opposition, led by Dean Barrow, argued against going to a referendum on the basis that Belizeans had not been given enough time for discussion of the issue and charged that the governing People's United Party was trying to hijack the issue to gain votes at the general elections due in the first half of 2008. The PUP countered that the opposition United Democratic Party were on "the wrong side of history".

Announcement of referendum and reaction 
Prime Minister of Belize Said Musa, on Monday January 7, 2008, announced that he had asked the Governor General, Sir Colville Young, to issue a writ of referendum to be held the same day as the general election. There is precedent for multiple voting in Belize: the 2003 elections for general and municipal were held on the same day. In anticipation of the announcement the PUP had released ads condemning the UDP position and encouraging Belizeans to vote for them as well as to vote in favour of an elected Senate, linking the two together. The PUP released its proposal for an elected Senate on January 17.

The Opposition UDP announced on January 8 that it had asked its supporters to either boycott the poll or vote "no". It trumpeted its alternate plan as a solution. Party leader Barrow amended the position later on by simply asking supporters to vote "no."

Reaction from the third parties was mixed. Even as many welcome the referendum, they are cautious about mixing it with the general election. Senator Godwin Hulse, Kevin Herrera and Henry Gordon of SPEAR have presented an alternate plan for the elected Senate as part of a list of reforms, to widespread discussion.

Procedure 
The referendum was held to the same procedures as a general election. All registered voters over 18 were eligible to participate. Separate places in the polling stations were provided for the referendum.

The voting for the referendum began at 7:00 AM CST (1300 UTC) on election day and finished at 6:00 PM CST (0000 UTC Friday). Counting of votes began at the various counting stations beginning after the counting of votes for the general elections and continuing until a simple majority was reached which declared support or dissent for the question.

Results 

The referendum passed with over 61 percent of the vote nationwide and won in 30 out of 31 constituencies. Only the Queen's Square constituency in Belize City voted against it.

By district

Source: Belize Elections and Boundaries Commission

References 

2008 referendums
Constitutional referendum
2008 constitutional referendum
Constitutional referendums